The France women's national beach handball team is the national team of France. It takes part in international beach handball competitions.

World Championships results
2018 – 11th place

European Championships results

2017 – 7th place
2019 – 13th place
2021 – 12th place

References

External links
Official website
IHF profile

Women's national beach handball teams
Women's national sports teams of France